Patrick Hickey (Bannu, British India 27 April 1927 – Dublin 16 October 1998) was an Irish printmaker, painter, artist and architect who founded the Graphic Studio Dublin in 1960.

Early life, family, and education 

Patrick Hickey was born on the 27 April 1927 in Bannu, British India, which is now a part of Pakistan. His father was involved in the Indian Army (1st Punjab Regiment) as a colonel. Although Hickey discovered early on that he had a passion for art, his family had no history of being involved in that industry. As his family moved from Bannu to Bedford in England, he began his education in Yorkshire at Ampleforth College from 1939 to 1945. Despite having a passion for art and paintings, Hickey only wanted to paint for the first time after he had received an acceptable and stable education, specifically because of the financial risks of that activity and the lack of artistic education and tools that were provided in Ireland at that time. Therefore, Hickey moved to Ireland in 1948 to study Italian, architecture, and history of art in University College Dublin (UCD) in the south of Dublin.

He graduated in 1954 from the agricultural school of UCD and then went to Wicklow to work with Irish architect Micheal Scott before he painted landscapes for the first time Hickey decided to begin selling his painting after graduating from UCD to begin his artistic career at an early age. In order to finish his education, Hickey succeeded in winning a scholarship to study printmaking, which consists of creating designs by printing them, for eight months in an Italian university in Urbino called the "Scuola del Libro". The specific types of printmaking he learned in the university were "lithography" and "etching". As a result of this year abroad, Hickey was able to show the skills he learnt in Urbino to other aspiring Irish artists such as Anne Yeats or Liam Miller, who eventually supported his artistic career.

Early career 
Throughout the 1950s, 1960s and 1970s, Hickey began to gain a reputation as an artist and exhibited his artwork at the Irish Exhibition of Living Art. This is where his pieces of the Wicklow landscape were first exhibited in 1955. Although he was a well known painter, he was best known for his work as a printmaker as he was very skilled in etching and lithography.

One of Hickey's largest projects was founding the Graphic Studio in Dublin in 1960. The lack of art education in Ireland was the problem that Hickey sought to resolve when he co-founded the Graphic Studio, along with fellow founders  Anne Yeats, Elizabeth Rivers, Leslie MacWeeney and Liam Miller. The studio was situated at 18 Upper Mount St., Dublin. Although it was small, the studio was a large contributor to the unfolding and development of modern graphic art at the time in Ireland, for which Hickey has been credited. Hickey remained a prominent figure in the Graphic Studio up to 1970. His role was then taken over by Mary Farl Powers, a print artist from the U.S.A. It was during this time as an ordinary member that Hickey created some of what is known as, his best work.

During the 1960s, some of Hickey's most pronounced prints included the "Stations of the Cross" (1965) and a collection of eighteen inferno etchings that illustrate Dante's 'Divine comedy' (1965). An Italian government competition held in honour of Dante's 700th birthday, awarded Hickey with a second place prize for his collection of "Divine comedy" etchings.

In 1967 Hickey received a scholarship from the Norwegian government, he spent his time in Norway painting watercolours. In this same year he designed a collection of postage stamps, for the use of the Irish government.

Late career

Inspirations 
Hickey's career took a turn after stepping down from his position as head of the Graphic Studio Gallery in Dublin. After visiting Corfu in 1975 he returned to Ireland to focus on new forms of work. He went on to create some of his most successful etching prints known as the "Months", which represent each month of the year in the form of a calendar. The forms and compositions of these works have often been compared to traditional Japanese artwork. Hickey admitted to being an admirer of the Japanese spirit in his review of the "Japanese Minor Arts of Netsuke and Inro", saying that he "painted like the Japanese even before he saw Japanese work." Additionally, Hickey's "Alphabet" (1988) and 'Aesop's Fables' (1990) series show his appreciation of Japanese works.

Achievements 
In 1971, Hickey took part in the national Rosc exhibitions. He was responsible for organising and exhibiting the eighteenth-century Irish delftware in Castletown House, County Kildare. Hickey believed that education in art needed reform, so he joined the college board for the National College of Art and Design (NCAD) in May 1972. That same year, Hickey's first exhibit of "Bogland, Wicklow" was at the Royal Hibernian Academy (RHA) in Dublin. Hickey, alongside consulting engineer Sean Mulcahy and sculptor Michael Biggs, was selected by the National Bank to design a set of Irish banknotes for the treasury in 1972. In 1974, Hickey exhibited some of his etching works for the first time outside of Ireland at the Purdhoe Gallery in London.
In 1980, RTÉ News reported Hickey's attendance at the National Gallery in Dublin to teach children of the ways of art. He wanted the young people of Ireland to visit the gallery and to see it as "a living place". He then exhibited his "Garden with Sago Palms Oil" on canvas in 1988 at the Taylor Galleries in Dublin. This would be one of the last exhibitions of his career. Hickey returned to teaching part-time in UCD at the School of Architecture, then later went on to be a professor at the NCAD in the late 1980s.

Later life 
Hickey worked on his art and exhibitions throughout his later life. In 1973 Hickey was diagnosed with Parkinson's disease. The Royal Institute of Architects of Ireland made him an honorary member in 1989. In 1986 Hickey also became head of painting in National College of Art and Design fine art faculty until 1990. In 1990 his oil works, "Virginia Creeper" and "Garden Wall: Morning Wicklow Hillside" were exhibited. His work in the 1990s included the two etchings, "Still Life with Pears and Apples" (1992) and 'The Fourth Tree (1993).' The Royal Institute of the Architects of Ireland held a retrospective exhibition of his work in 1994 which was followed by a show held in the Graphic Studio Gallery in 1995 of Hickeys etchings. Hickey had completed twenty seven pieces over the two and a half years prior.

There was a television documentary on RTE on 28 November 1996 called "Patrick Hickey Artist" in tribute to Hickey. Due to deteriorating health he had to retire from teaching in the 1990s. In May 1997 he held his last exhibition at the Taylor Galleries in Kildare street in Dublin. Due to his lack of energy and slowing strength because of his Parkinson's disease he wanted to make this last exhibition his best. This exhibition consisted of seventeen oil paintings, all of them landscapes or still lifes. The works included "Huguenot Cemetery" and 'Cat with Aubergines.' In 1997 Hickey moved from Mulgrave Terrace in Dun Laoghaire to nearby Clearwater Cove. The house in Mulgrave Terrace sold for two million euros. He gave the new owners of the house a painting of Japanese cherry trees.

Death 
Hickey died from Parkinson's disease on the 16 October in 1998. He was 71 years old. He died in his home at Clearwater Cove, Monkstown with his wife Elizabeth ('Bizzie') Hickey, (nee Hallinan) present. Hickey was cremated in Glasnevin Crematorium. In 2000 the Graphic studio gallery held an exhibition of Hickey's work and a posthumous exhibition of his work was held in 2007 by the Dalkey Arts Centre.

Legacy 
According to his obituary in The Irish Times, Patrick Hickey "achieved so much with his life", including marriage, family, becoming a successful artist, architect and lecturer. He was viewed as a forward person, and he valued art as sheer pleasure. Hickey's ideas about art and architecture have influenced the future of art in Ireland and elsewhere. According to an obituary in the Irish Independent, he was "a founder of modern art graphics in Ireland". Hickey had wanted to be a musician and he put musical notes in all the bank notes that he created. Following his death, Hickey's "techniques of etching and lithography and other graphic media" continued to be carried out in the Graphic Studio Dublin. The Graphic Studio Dublin held an exhibition in 2000 with Hickey's landscape prints from the 1970s. Hickey's art is on sale at auction on invaluable.com since 2015. He left behind an extensive art collection. His art is portrayed in several galleries around Ireland, including the Arts Council of Ireland, Crawford Municipal Gallery, Cork; Hugh Lane Gallery, Dublin, Limerick city gallery of art; national self-portrait collection and University of Limerick. The UK independent said after Hickey's death in 1998, that he had the most influence on art and design In Ireland compared to other artists.

Hickey left behind his wife and three children. One of his sons, Joby Hickey, also became an artist. As a child, Joby had appeared on the old 50 pound note that Hickey designed. Joby studied in fine art in Dun Laoghaire Art School where Hickey had a lot of influence. Hickey's Victorian home in Dun Laoghaire went on sale in February 2022 for two million euro.

References

External links
  Obituary in the Independent (London)

1927 births
1998 deaths
20th-century Irish painters
Irish male painters
Irish expatriates in India
20th-century Irish male artists